Save Me is the third EP by American singer-songwriter and producer, Empress Of released June 24, 2022 via her independent label, Majora Arcana. The EP was preceded by three singles, Save Me, Dance For You and Turn the Table with Jim-E Stack released April 8, May 25, and June 23, 2022, respectively.

Critical reception
Save Me was favourably received upon its release. Fran Gonzalez of Madrid-based dod Magazine, offered a fairly positive review opining it as "a collection of fierce and scathing tracks where [Rodriguez] does not hesitate to bring out her most sexual side" and further praising Rodriguez's uncanny songwriting and production on the latter half of the EP, stating "The last blows of Save Me exhibit a treatment of electronics quite unusual to date in Rodriguez's range of resources, revealing us from more exotic and calm flashes of Kept Up to more syncopated and dark textures of Cry For Help".

Writing for Pitchfork, Hannah Jocelyn offered a more reserved and mixed review stating, "Save Me represents an opportunity to consolidate [Rodriguez's] sound while exploring less intense territory". Jocelyn further highlights the single, Dance for You as "the EP’s most accomplished composition" but criticized certain repetitive song structures and lyrical motifs saying, "Almost every song climaxes with a section alternating between a synth riff and a title drop—each effective on their own, but noticeable when clumped together." .

Track listing

Personnel
Lorely Rodriguez – vocals, synthesizer, production, writing 
BJ Burton – production, writing 
Johan Lenox – production, string arrangements 
Yasmeen Al-Mazeedi – violin, orchestra 
John Rocca – writing 
Andy Sennett – writing 
Jim-E Stack – writing 

Technical

Robin Schmidt - mastering
Geoff Swan – mixing
Alexa Hernandez - makeup
Chris Horan - styling
Natalia Mantini – cover photo
Hair by Mya - hair

References

2022 EPs
Empress Of albums